Crossley's ground thrush (Geokichla crossleyi) is a species of bird in the family Turdidae. It is found in Cameroon, Republic of the Congo, Democratic Republic of the Congo, and Nigeria.

Its natural habitat is subtropical or tropical moist montane forests. It is becoming rare due to habitat loss.

References

Crossley's ground thrush
Birds of Central Africa
Crossley's ground thrush
Taxonomy articles created by Polbot